Erlendur may refer to:

 Detective Erlendur, a character in novels by Arnaldur Indriðason
 Bishop Erlendur, who built the Magnus Cathedral in the Faroe Islands
 Erlendur Patursson, Faroese politician and writer
 Erlendur Haraldsson, psychology professor at the University of Iceland